E400 may refer to:
Alginic acid
Alexander Dennis Enviro400, a twin-axle, low-floor double-decker bus
Eclipse 400, a light jet aircraft
Acer beTouch E400, a smartphone 
Mercedes-Benz E400 Hybrid, an automobile
One of the locomotives of Taiwan Railways Administration
GV-E400 series, a DEMU train type on order by JR East in Japan